Hermann von Mumm is a German bobsledder who competed in the 1930s. He won a silver medal in the two-man event at the 1934 FIBT World Championships in Engelberg.

References
Bobsleigh two-man world championship medalists since 1931

German male bobsledders
Possibly living people
Year of birth missing